Earle School District is a public school district based in Earle, Arkansas, United States.

The school district encompasses  of land, The district includes portions of Crittenden County, serving Earle and most of Jennette. It also includes portions of Cross County.

Founded in 1919, the district proves comprehensive education for more than 700 pre-kindergarten through grade 12 students while employing more than 140 teachers and staff. The district and its schools are accredited by the Arkansas Department of Education (ADE).

In 2017 the district had 560 students. In November 2017 the district was placed under the control of the Arkansas Department of Education.

Schools 
 Earle High School, located in Earle and serving more than 325 students in grades 7 through 12.
 Earle Elementary School, located in Earle and serving more than 375 students in pre-kindergarten through grade 6.

References

External links 
 

School districts in Arkansas
Education in Crittenden County, Arkansas
Education in Cross County, Arkansas
1919 establishments in Arkansas
School districts established in 1919